Simple Man is the second album by German countertenor Klaus Nomi, released on 23 November 1982 by RCA. It was also the last album of original material to be released during Nomi's lifetime.

The album consists of a mix of opera and pop music, songs by Renaissance composer John Dowland and excerpts from Baroque composer Henry Purcell's Dido and Aeneas juxtaposed with "Ding-Dong! The Witch Is Dead" from The Wizard of Oz and Marlene Dietrich's "Falling in Love Again".

Songs and musical style  
Simple Man takes inspiration from a variety of musical genres. Art rock, new wave and disco are combined with Klaus Nomi's love for classical opera, and glazed up with early 1980s synth-oriented pop music. The pop rock tracks "After the Fall" and "Simple Man" are written by Kristian Hoffman, who also contributed songs to Nomi's eponymous debut album. Hoffman had been musical director and keyboard player in Nomi's live band prior to the recording of Nomi's first album. However, disagreements with Nomi's management over song publishing issues had let to the band being discarded in favour of session musicians. "They had to come back and rehire me for the second album," Hoffman said in 2019, "because they did a second album without me and the label rejected it. I'd already had those songs written for him. So it turned out to be really great because those were my favorite recordings of his." 

The rhythmically tight "ICUROK" ("I see you are OK") is synth-pop disco with shades of Kraftwerk, written by guitarist and Nomi-collaborator George Elliott. He also wrote the music for "Three Wishes," which is much closer to a new wave sound, with its slashing guitar lines and fast tempo. It has lyrics by artist Jamie Dalglish, including a poem from his young niece Sierra. The country-influenced disco track "Rubberband Lazer" features pedal steel guitar, violin and sci-fi lyrics, and is written by former Nomi-collaborators Joey Arias and Anthony Frere. The album also contains disco and synth-pop takes on Doris Troy's 1963 R&B song "Just One Look" and "Ding-Dong! The Witch Is Dead" from the 1939 film The Wizard of Oz (here shortened to "Ding Dong"); and a post-punk-influenced, guitar-oriented version of Marlene Dietrich's Falling in Love Again, originally recorded in 1930. 

Moving into classical territory, "Wayward Sisters" and "Death" (a.k.a. "Dido's Lament"), both from the opera Dido and Aeneas by Baroque composer Henry Purcell, showcase Nomi's countertenor voice to a synthesizer arrangement by keyboard player Jack Waldman. Bookending the album are the tracks "From Beyond" and "Return," both based on the choral piece "If My Complaints Could Passions Move" by Renaissance composer John Dowland. The wordless melodies are delivered by Nomi to an atmospheric synthesizer backing.

Reception

In a retrospective review, AllMusic's Sean Carruthers wrote that "while the album starts out promisingly with an atmospheric fade-in followed by a hard dance number with the occasional Birthday Party-style guitar thrown in, the rest of the album did its damnedest to move the album's overall tone to one of self-parody." As examples, he pointed out the "hyper-sugary" cover of "Just One Look," the "faux-country disco" of "Rubberband Lazer," and the version of "Ding-Dong! The Witch Is Dead." Dismissing most of the album as "kitsch," Carruthers felt that Nomi's "true capabilities are shown off by his versions of classical works."

Track listing

Personnel
Musicians
Klaus Nomi – vocals, backing vocals (2-4, 8, 10), arrangement (5)
Kristian Hoffman – keyboards (2, 8, 10), synthesizer (8), percussion (8), arrangements (2, 4, 8, 10)
Jack Waldman – synthesizer (1, 5, 7, 8, 11, 12), percussion (1), sound effects (6, 9), arrangements (1, 7, 11, 12)
Tommy Mandel – keyboards (3, 5), synthesizer (6, 9)
Jon Cobert – keyboards (4)
Man Parrish – synthesizer programming (2, 5, 6, 8, 10)
Scott Woody – guitar (4), pedal steel guitar (6)
George Elliott – guitar (5, 9), percussion (9), arrangements (5, 9)
Robert Mache – guitar (2, 8, 10), bass (2)
Jimmy Zhivago – guitar (3, 9)
John Kay – bass (3, 5, 6, 9)
Rick Pascual – bass (4)
Kevin Tooley – drums (2, 6, 8, 10)
Robert Medici – drums (3, 5, 9), backing vocals (9)
Daniel Elfassy – drums (4), percussion (2, 8-10)
Paul Rutner – additional drums (8)
Steve Elson – saxophone (3)
Michael Levine – violin (6, 9)
Julie Burger – backing vocals (4)

Technical
Ron Johnsen – producer, mixing
Klaus Nomi – producer
Carl Casella – engineer, mixing
Paul Silvestro – assistant engineer
Page Wood – art direction
Randy L. Dunbar – art direction
Maxine St. Clair – cover photograph

References

1982 albums
Klaus Nomi albums
RCA Records albums